Julio Elías Musimessi (9 July 1924 in Resistencia, Chaco – 4 September 1996 in Morón) was an Argentine football goalkeeper who played for Newell's Old Boys, Boca Juniors and the Argentina national team.

Musimessi started his playing career in 1944 with Newell's Old Boys of Rosario, he played 183 times for the club before his transfer to Boca Juniors in 1953. In 1954 Boca won the league championship. He played 155 times for the club.

At the end of his playing career he played for Green Cross of Chile.

At international level Musimessi played 14 times for Argentina. He was part of the squad that won the 1955 Copa América. He was also included in the 1956 Copa América and the 1958 FIFA World Cup squads.

Musimessi was known as "El Arquero cantor" (the singing goalkeeper) because of his performances on radio. After retiring from the game he established a bar in Morón.

Titles

References

External links

Julio Musimessi at BDFA.com.ar 

1924 births
1997 deaths
People from Resistencia, Chaco
Argentine people of Italian descent
Argentine footballers
Argentine expatriate footballers
Argentina international footballers
1958 FIFA World Cup players
Association football goalkeepers
Newell's Old Boys footballers
Boca Juniors footballers
Club de Deportes Green Cross footballers
Chilean Primera División players
Argentine Primera División players
Expatriate footballers in Chile
Sportspeople from Chaco Province